This is a list of the weekly Canadian RPM magazine number one Top Singles chart of 1968.

Top singles chart of 1968

See also
1968 in music

List of Billboard Hot 100 number ones of 1968 (United States)
List of Cashbox Top 100 number-one singles of 1968

References

Notes

Citations

External links
 Read about RPM Magazine at the AV Trust
 Search RPM charts here at Library and Archives Canada
RPM Magazine from Canada years 1964–1999 at American Radio History

1968 in Canadian music
Canada Singles
1968